Musical Shapes is the third album by American singer Carlene Carter.

The only song to make the Billboard country singles chart was "Baby Ride Easy," (written by Richard Dobson) a duet with Dave Edmunds of the British rock band Rockpile. At the time of the album's release, Carter was married to Nick Lowe, Edmunds's bandmate in Rockpile; Lowe was the producer of the album. It peaked at number 88 in Australia.

Track listing

Personnel
Carlene Carter - guitar, piano, vocals
Dave Edmunds - guitar, vocals
Billy Bremner - guitar
John Ciambotti - bass
Sean Hopper - organs
Nick Lowe - bass
John McFee - guitar
Roger Rettick - steel guitar
Bob Andrews - Hammond organ
Kevin Wells - drums
Terry Williams - drums
Cover design by Barney Bubbles

References

1980 albums
Carlene Carter albums
Albums produced by Nick Lowe
F-Beat Records albums
Warner Records albums